Elections to the Cork Corporation took place on Thursday 15 January 1920 as part of that year's Irish local elections.

Campaign
The Labour vote was split between the Cork and District Labour Council and the more militant Irish Transport and General Workers' Union (ITGWU); the latter formed an electoral alliance with Sinn Féin, whose MPs elected in December 1918 had proclaimed an Irish Republic in January 1919. Polling day was marred by scenes of violence between supporters of Sinn Féin and ex-servicemen.

Results by party

Results by electoral area
The Local Government (Ireland) Act 1919 introduced the single transferable vote, so the seven wards used in previous council elections were revised into seven borough electoral areas (BEAs). Four inner wards were merged into one BEA, two outer wards were split into two and three BEAs, and one was retained as a BEA. The first two candidates elected in each area would be styled "alderman", the rest "councillor".

Central
37 candidates. Wards: Centre, North Centre, South Centre, and West.

North-East
26 candidates

North-West No.1
23 candidates; covering Sunday's Well area

North-West No.2
13 candidates; covering Shandon area.

North-West No.3
18 candidates; covering Blackpool area

South No.1
30 candidates

South No.2
18 candidates

Subsequent changes
William F. O'Connor, having been returned in three BEAs, chose to represent North-West No.1, triggering by-elections in the other two BEAs on 10 March, both won by Sinn Féin candidates: Barry Egan defeated Jeremiah Lane in the Central ward, while Donal O'Callaghan was returned unopposed in South No.1. Ten subsequent by-elections returned: Joseph Hennessy, Madeline Hegarty, William Kenneally, Michael Moroney, Cornelius Neenan, Seán Nolan, Michael O'Donovan, Paul O'Flynn, James O'Riordan, and Jeremiah Walsh. Among the vacancies filled were several deaths related to the Irish War of Independence:  Tomás Mac Curtain (assassinated by Royal Irish Constabulary members on 20 March 1920), his successor as Lord Mayor Terence MacSwiney (died on hunger strike on 25 October 1920), and Tadhg Barry (shot in Ballykinlar Camp, 15 November 1921).

In 1924 the Cumann na nGaedheal government dissolved the city council for misgovernment, after which the corporation was administered by an unelected commissioner. The next Free State local elections, originally scheduled for 1923, were repeatedly postponed until 1925. The city council was excluded from the 1925 and 1928 local elections and not restored until 1929, reduced to 21 councillors, with the entire county borough forming a single 21-seat electoral area.

References

Footnotes

Sources

Citations

1920 Irish local elections
1920